Las Dos Almas del Ser is a Spanish novel by Sigfrido Cuen published in 2011.

Plot 
A young Mexican man meets his best friends at the living room of his house. He didn't call them to have fun as they were used to, instead to reveal them a heart-rending secret, which has been hidden from them and their families and has completely changed his existence.

References

2011 novels
21st-century Spanish novels